Harry Vandermeulen (27 November 1928 – 27 November 2022) was a Belgian politician. A member of the Christian People's Party, he served as governor of Limburg from 1978 to 1995.

Vandermeulen died on 27 November 2022, his 94th birthday.

References

1928 births
2022 deaths
Christian Social Party (Belgium, defunct) politicians
Christian Democratic and Flemish politicians
Governors of Limburg (Belgium)
KU Leuven alumni